Indifference is the second studio album by American punk rock band the Proletariat.

The record was named after its opening song, which was inspired by the photography of David Henry of the homeless in Boston, Massachusetts. One of Henry's photos serves as the album's front cover.

In late 1984, before Indifference was completed, lead vocalist Richard Brown and drummer Tom McKnight left the band. They were replaced by Laurel Ann Bowman, and Steve Welch, both of whom performed on the new album's songs "Homeland" and "The Guns Are Winning".

Roger Miller of Mission of Burma makes a guest appearance playing the piano in the track "An Uneasy Peace", which is an updated version from that contributed to the hardcore punk compilation P.E.A.C.E., released a year earlier on R Radical Records.

Indifference was preceded by its lead single "Marketplace".

Production and release
Produced by Lou Giordano and Frank Michaels, Indifference was recorded in different sessions at Radiobeat Studios in Boston, mixed at White Dog Studio in Newton, Massachusetts, and mastered by George "Porky" Peckham at Porky's Mastering in London, England. It was released in 1985 on Homestead Records, on LP and Compact Cassette. Etched onto its run-out grooves, the vinyl release features, in a mocking way, a paraphrase of the main conclusion of the 1984 Ronald Reagan's Task Force on Food Assistance report, which reads as follows: "There is no evidence of wide spread hunger in America.." (side A), "....Government report on federal assistance." (side B).

Critical reception
Oliver Sheppard, contributor at the online magazine Souciant, was of the view that Indifference:

For his part, Ryan Foley, from The Music Museum of New England, commented:

The punk zine Suburban Voice wrote:

"Marketplace" 7"

"Marketplace" is a song by the Proletariat, originally released in 1985 on Homestead Records as the lead single for the band's second studio album, Indifference, on which it is featured as the closing track. The B-side to the single, "Death of a Hedon", was not included on the album. Both songs would be re-released in 1998 as part of the band's anthology Voodoo Economics and Other American Tragedies.

The record's front cover features a photograph of a homeless man lying at the top of a stairway while he is avoided and ignored by the people passing by. The image was taken by photographer David Henry at one of the entrances to the Boylston light rail station of the Boston, Massachusetts, rapid transit system.

Reissues
Out of print after its original release, Indifference would later resurface, in its entirety, on the band's 2-CD anthology Voodoo Economics and Other American Tragedies, compiled in 1998 by Taang! Records.

Track listing
Music and arrangements by Peter Bevilacqua and Frank Michaels, lyrics by Richard Brown, except where noted.

Personnel

The Proletariat
 Richard Brown – vocals
 Frank Michaels – guitar
 Peter Bevilacqua – bass, backing vocals
 Tom McKnight – drums
 Laurel Bowman - vocals (tracks A4, B4)
 Steve Welch - drums (A4, B4)

Guest performers
 Roger Miller – piano (A7)

Production
same credits for the "Marketplace" 7"

 Lou Giordano - co-production, co-engineering
 Frank Michaels - co-production
 Jimmy Dufour – co-engineering
 Josiah McElheny – engineering (assistance)
 George "Porky" Peckham – mastering
 Pickles – graphic design
 David Henry – photography

Notes

References

Further reading
Reviews
 Yohannan, Tim (June 1986). "Marketplace". Maximumrocknroll (37).
 CMJ New Music Report (August 29, 1986). Indifference, review. CMJ New Music Report (99).
 Rubin, Mike (October 23, 1986). "Records – The Proletariat: Indifference (Homestead Records)". The Michigan Daily. p. 8.
 Sullivan, Jim (November 13, 1986). "The Proletariat: Indifference (Homestead)". The Boston Globe Calendar.
 Eddy, Chuck (September 9, 1986). "The Proletariat: RIch Men Poor Men". The Village Voice XXXI (36).

External links
Official
 "The Proletariat: Indifference". The Proletariat.
 "The Proletariat: Marketplace". The Proletariat.
Reviews
 Sheppard, Oliver (September 10, 2012). "Pioneers of Postpunk". Souciant.
 Tieuma (December 5, 2014). "Crucial Records #2 : The Proletariat – Indifference". Droid Rage Zine.
 Erich (December 27, 2009). "The Proletariat- Marketplace 7″ (Homestead Records, USA, 1985)". Good Bad Music for Bad, Bad Times! Archived from the original on December 10, 2011.

The Proletariat albums
1985 albums